The 1997 FIA GT Laguna Seca 3 Hours  was the eleventh and final race of the 1997 FIA GT Championship season.  It was run at Laguna Seca Raceway, United States on October 26, 1997.

Official results
Class winners in bold.  Cars failing to complete 75% of winner's distance marked as Not Classified (NC).

† – #4 and #5 David Price Racing entries were disqualified due to failing post-race technical inspection.  Both cars have front brake ducts larger than those allowed by the rules.

Statistics
 Pole Position – #12 AMG-Mercedes – 1:17.941
 Fastest Lap – #7 Porsche AG – 1:19.713
 Distance – 468.223 km
 Average Speed – 155.398 km/h

External links
 World Sports Prototype Racing – Race Results

L
Laguna Seca 3 Hours